The Griffith–Sowers House is a United States historic home located near Salisbury, Rowan County, North Carolina.  It was built between 1930 and 1932 and is a large two-story, Colonial Revival style frame country house. It features a five-bay wide center block that is covered by a side-gable slate roof and linked by shallow one-bay wide hyphens to flanking, recessed, and perpendicular gable-front two-story wings. Other features include the poultry house (c. 1934–1940), barn (c. 1934-c. 1960), small storage building (c. 1940–1950), and landscaped grounds.

It was listed on the National Register of Historic Places in 2009.

References

Houses on the National Register of Historic Places in North Carolina
Colonial Revival architecture in North Carolina
Houses completed in 1932
Houses in Salisbury, North Carolina
National Register of Historic Places in Rowan County, North Carolina